he 2022–23 Senior Women's National Football Championship, also known as Hero Senior Women's National Football Championship for sponsorship reasons, will be the 27th edition of the Senior Women's National Football Championship, the premier competition in India for women's teams representing regional and state football associations.

Format 
Thirty-one teams have been divided into six groups in the qualifying round, which will be played in six different venues across the country. The Final Round of the competition will have a total of 12 teams - six group winners, five best runners-up, and the Railways, who have been given direct entry. The 12 teams will be divided into two groups of six each. The top two teams from each group will qualify for the semi-finals

Schedule

Centralised venues 
 Group I → GNDU Sports Complex, Amritsar, Punjab
 Group II → IGIS Complex, Haldwani/Rudrapur, Uttarakhand
 Group III → Navelim and Benaulim, South Goa, Goa
 Group IV → Pant Stadium, Bhilai, Chhattisgarh
 Group V → Sports Ground, Hindustan College of Science and Technology, Mathura, Uttar Pradesh
 Group VI → Bangalore Football Stadium, Bengaluru, Karnataka

Group stage

Group I

Group II

Group III

Group IV

References

Senior Women's National Football Championship